Dmytro Hnidenko (born 13 October 1975) is a retired Ukrainian middleweight weightlifter. He placed eighth at the 1999 World Championships and 2000 Olympics.

References

Ukrainian male weightlifters
1975 births
Living people
Olympic weightlifters of Ukraine
Weightlifters at the 2000 Summer Olympics